Lemington is a district of Newcastle upon Tyne in England.

Lemington may also refer to:

Lemington, Vermont, a town
Lemington, Wisconsin, an unincorporated community
Lemington, Pittsburgh, Pennsylvania; part of Lincoln–Lemington–Belmar
Lemington, a village in Gloucestershire, England, now known as Lower Lemington

See also
Leamington (disambiguation)